The Mike Ridley Trophy is awarded to the player who leads the Manitoba Junior Hockey League in points scoring during the regular season.  The trophy is named after former National Hockey League star Mike Ridley, who holds the MJHL single season scoring records for points (191) and goals (91), which were set with the St. Boniface Saints during the 1982–83 season. 

The current trophy was first awarded in 2003, replacing the Selkirk Steelers Trophy previous awarded to the scoring champion.

MJHL Scoring Champions

CJHL Leaders highlined

See also
List of top goal scorers in the Manitoba Junior Hockey League

External links 
Manitoba Junior Hockey League
Hockey Hall of Fame
Winnipeg Free Press Archives
Brandon Sun Archives

Manitoba Junior Hockey League trophies and awards